Michael Copley is a British virtuoso flautist and recorder player. He is a professional musician who, as well as playing the recorder and flute, is an exponent of other traditional, early and folk woodwind instruments, most notably the ocarina, an Anglo-Italian development of the ceramic vessel flute.

Groups 
Cambridge Buskers - Michael Copley (flute, recorder, ocarina, crumhorn) and Dag Ingram (accordion) 
Sambuca - Michael Copley (recorder) and Peter Martin (lute, theorbo, guitar)
The Classic Buskers - Michael Copley and Ian Moore (piano accordion)
The Chuckerbutty Ocarina Quartet - Michael Copley, Yuzuru Yamashiro, Peter Martin, Michael S. Murray

Discography 
“Concerto for 2 mandolins etc.” - Pickett/Hogwood/Copley et al. (Decca)
“Vivaldi - Concerti” - Füri/Copley et al. (Deutsche Grammophon)
“Lloyd Webber Plays Lloyd Webber” - Lloyd Webber/R. Phil. Orch./Copley et al. (Philips)
“Tippett: Choral Works” - Copley/Hodges/Nallen et al. (Nimbus)
“Micro Classics” - Classic Buskers (Seaview)
“Handel with Care” - Classic Buskers (Seaview)
“Omnibusk” - Classic Buskers (Seaview)
“The Ocarina is No Trombone” - Chuckerbutty Quartet/Copley (Seaview)
“Sambuca” - Sambuca (Seaview)
"A little Street Music"  - Copley/Ingram  (Deutsche Grammophon)

External links
Michael Copley's home page

Alumni of the University of Cambridge
British buskers
British recorder players
Living people
Year of birth missing (living people)